Marni Thompson is a Canadian actress, whose most extensive starring role was in Paradise Falls, a soap opera on Showcase Television, starting in 2001.  She played Valerie Hunter, a bored local police officer in a small community.

Except for her appearance in the film Three to Tango (1999), her acting has been mainly on TV.  She has had guest roles on TV series, such as Relic Hunter, The City, Earth: Final Conflict, Power Play, and Psi Factor: Chronicles of the Paranormal.  She was also a character on the TV mini-series Robocop: Prime Directives.

Marni was born Stratford, Ontario and grew up in Toronto.

External links

Canadian television actresses
Canadian film actresses
Canadian soap opera actresses
Actresses from Ontario
People from Stratford, Ontario
Year of birth missing (living people)
Living people